Maximilian Ernest of Austria (17 November 1583 – 18 February 1616), was an Austrian prince member of the House of Habsburg and by birth Archduke of Austria.

He was the son of Archduke Charles II of Austria, in turn, the son of Emperor Ferdinand I, and Maria Anna of Bavaria. His elder brother Archduke Ferdinand, succeeded as Holy Roman Emperor in 1619.

Life
Born in Graz, little is known about his first years of life. His first notable presence was in 1592, when Maximilian Ernest and his mother accompanied his older sister Anna to marry King Sigismund III of Poland.

Together with his brother Ferdinand and his cousins Maximilian III and Matthias, Maximilian Ernest signed a document dated 25 April 1606 in Vienna, under which his cousin, Emperor Rudolf II, was declared incapable of governing because of his mental illness and Matthias could assume the headship of the Habsburg territories as regent.

His cousin Maximilian III, called the German Grand Master (der Deutschmeister), allowed Maximiliam Ernest to join the Teutonic Knights in 1615, and one year later, in 1616, he appointed him Landkomtur of the Bailiwick of Austria. Already named Coadjutor of the Teutonic Order was determined that Maximilian Ernest would succeed his cousin in the office of Grand Master, but he died unexpectedly aged thirty-two, unmarried and childless (however he left an illegitimate son, Don Carlos d'Austria, who died in 1638). He was buried in the Seckau Abbey.

Ancestors

References

1583 births
1616 deaths
17th-century House of Habsburg
Austrian princes
Sons of monarchs